Everytown may refer to:

 Welcome to Everytown, a 2007 book by Julian Baggini
 Escape from Everytown, a 1995 book by Terrance Dicks
 Everytown for Gun Safety, an American nonprofit organization based in New York

See also
Anytown, USA (disambiguation)